The 2009–10 Magyar Kupa (English: Hungarian Cup) was the 70th season of Hungary's annual knock-out cup football competition. It started with the first match of Round 1 on 5 August 2009 and ended with the Final held on 8 May 2010 at Stadium Puskás Ferenc, Budapest. The winners earned a place in the second qualifying round of the 2010–11 UEFA Europa League. Budapest Honvéd were the defending champions.

Round 1
Matches were played between 5 and 9 August 2009 and involved the teams qualified through the local cup competitions during the previous season and the Nemzeti Bajnokság III teams.

1Police–Ola LSK advanced to the next round because Ják SE used an ineligible player.

Round 2
Matches were played between 19 and 26 August and on 23 September 2009 and involved the winners of Round 1 and the 2009–10 Nemzeti Bajnokság II teams.

Round 3
Matches were played between 9 and 29 September 2009. The winners of Round 2 were joined by the majority of the 2009–10 Nemzeti Bajnokság I teams; sides involved in a European cup competition were given a bye to the next round.

Round 4
Matches were played between 29 September and 7 October 2009 and involved the winners of Round 3.

Round 5
The sixteen winners of the previous round were drawn into eight two-legged matches. The first-leg matches were played between 20 and 22 October 2009, the return legs took place on 27–28 October 2009. The winners on aggregate advanced to the next round.

|}

Quarter-finals
As in the previous round, ties were played over two legs. The winners advanced to the semi-finals.

|}

Zalaegerszegi TE advanced 6–1 on aggregate.

Újpest advanced 2–0 on aggregate.

Budapest Honvéd advanced 2–1 on aggregate.

Aggregate score 2–2, Debreceni VSC advanced on penalty shootout.

Semi-finals
Ties in the semi-finals were also played over two legs.

|}

Debreceni VSC advances 3–2 on aggregate.

Zalaegerszegi TE advances 1–0 on aggregate.

Final

The match was played on 26 May 2010.

See also
 2009–10 Nemzeti Bajnokság I
 2009–10 Nemzeti Bajnokság II
 2009–10 Ligakupa

References

External links
 Official site 
 soccerway.com

2009–10 in Hungarian football
2009–10 domestic association football cups
2009-10